"I Say Yeah!" is a single released by all five of the signed artists of Neosite Discs, a sub-label of Ki/oon Records dedicated to R&B, hip hop and reggae, to celebrate the label's 10th anniversary. The single received minor popularity, entering the chart at #8, dropping to #20 in its second week, and staying in the charts for seven weeks. The A-side was the opening theme for NTV's Music Fighter in October.

A live concert was held at Shibuya-AX on October 27, 2006, to celebrate the 10th anniversary, with all of the participating artists performing the A-side from the single as well as a number of their own tracks.

Track listing

CD portion
 "I Say Yeah!" (Micro, May J., Pushim, Kuro, C. Ricketts, S. Sasaki, J. Yamamoto) – 4:35
 "I Say Yeah! (DJ Bobo James RMX)" – 4:34
 "I Say Yeah! (Breathrough remix)" – 5:55
 "I Say Yeah! (Fickle remix)" – 5:13

DVD portion
 "I Say Yeah!" music video
 Making of I Say Yeah!
 "I Say Yeah!" full video with Calvin Voneravong

Charts 
Oricon Sales Chart (Japan)

External links
 Neosite 10th

2006 singles
2006 songs
Ki/oon Music singles